Rajkiya Engineering College, Ambedkar Nagar is a government engineering college located in Akbarpur, Ambedkar Nagar district, Uttar Pradesh, India. It is an affiliated college of Dr. A.P.J. Abdul Kalam Technical University. Rajkiya Engineering College (R.E.C.) Ambedkar Nagar was established by Government of Uttar Pradesh under special component plan in year 2010, the college has started offering B.Tech Programme in three disciplines – Information Technology (IT), Electrical Engineering (EE) and Civil Engineering (CE) with intake of 60 seats in each branches from the session 2010–11.

History 
Rajkiya Engineering College, Ambedkar Nagar was established in October 2010 and originally operated from the campus of Kamla Nehru Institute of Technology  (KNIT) in Sultanpur. It moved to its own campus in Ambedkar Nagar in 2012.

The director of KNIT served as the institutes principal until 2015, when K. S. Verma has joined as a regular director.

Academics
The Institute offers 4-year, 8-semester B.Tech courses. The B.Tech curriculum prescribed by Abdul Kalam Technical University Lucknow consists of theory courses, practicals, projects and seminars. It also provides weightage for industrial training and extracurricular activities.

Departments 

The Institute has following Academic Departments
 Department of Applied Sciences & Humanities
 Department of Civil Engineering
 Department of Electrical Engineering
 Department of Information Technology
 Workshop
 Central Library

Admissions 
The institute admits students for its Bachelor in Technology (B.Tech) programme from all over India through the competitive Common Entrance Test SEE-UPTU.

Campus facilities and amenities
REC has different blocks allotted for various academic activities which include co-curricular and extra co-curricular activities. Apart from hostels, REC has admin block, a SAC (Student Activity Center), REC playing courts, Academic block, various engineering labs like Mechanics lab and Workshops which consist of various shops like welding, foundry, carpentry, etc. that are generally included in engineering syllabuses across the country. Many of the labs like networking, Java and various Information Technology Department labs are located in academic blocks. The college consists of a number of canteens for students and faculties.

Events

Annual college festival - AVIGHNA
AVIGHNA provides opportunity to the budding talent in the institute to showcase their talent to a larger audience. At Avighna we have various events by Sports, Cultural, Technical, FineArt & Literary Councils of the college. It provides the students to break off from their routine and explore their creative streaks in a variety of events.

National Sports Festival - KSHITIZ
KSHITIZ is the national level sports fest which promotes a spirit of friendly competition among the students of various institutions all around the country. KSHITIZ involves students from all over India competing in the university's sports facilities. The festival includes various sports events like cricket, badminton, basketball, football, handball, athletics, carom, chess, volleyball and many other events.

See also 
 List of colleges affiliated with Dr. A.P.J. Abdul Kalam Technical University

References

External links
 

Engineering colleges in Uttar Pradesh
Colleges in Ambedkar Nagar district
Educational institutions established in 2010
Dr. A.P.J. Abdul Kalam Technical University
Akbarpur, Ambedkar Nagar
2010 establishments in Uttar Pradesh